The Xiangjiaba Dam is a large gravity dam on the Jinsha River, a tributary of the Yangtze River in Yunnan Province and Sichuan Province in southwest China. Xiangjiaba Dam is China's fourth-biggest hydropower station following Three Gorges Dam, Baihetan Dam and Xiluodu Dam.
Construction started on November 26, 2006, and its first generator was commissioned in October 2012. The last generator was commissioned on July 9, 2014.

The output of the generating station is connected to an ±800 kV HVDC link, the Xiangjiaba–Shanghai HVDC system, which transmits the power to Shanghai.

See also 

 List of power stations in China

References 

Hydroelectric power stations in Sichuan
Hydroelectric power stations in Yunnan
Dams in China
Dams on the Jinsha River
Dams completed in 2012
2014 establishments in China
Energy infrastructure completed in 2014
Gravity dams
Buildings and structures in Zhaotong